The list of people from Salina, Kansas includes only notable people who have resided in Salina, Kansas and who currently have a Wikipedia article.

Academia

 Alexander Brown Mackie (1894–1966), co-founder of Brown Mackie College
 Kenneth S. Davis (1912–1999), historian
 Steven Hawley (1951– ), astronaut, physics professor
 Wes Jackson (1936– ), environmentalist, plant geneticist
 Breon Mitchell (1942– ), literary translator, professor of Germanic studies

Arts and entertainment

Film, television, and theater
 Tyrees Allen (1954– ), actor
 Dwight Frye (1899–1943), actor
 Otto Hulett (1898–1983), actor
 Betty Knox (1906–1963), dancer with Wilson, Keppel and Betty; war correspondent 
 George Murdock (1930–2012), actor

Journalism
 Thomas Craven (1888–1969), writer, critic, and art historian
 Paul Harvey (1918–2009), radio broadcaster
 Laura M. Johns (1849–1935), suffragist, journalist
Vera Brady Shipman (1889–1932), arts journalist, composer, clubwoman
 Gene Wojciechowski, sports journalist, author

Music
 Herbie Harper (1920–2012), jazz trombonist
 Terry Kirkman (1939– ), singer/songwriter of The Association
 Charlie LaVere (1910–1983), jazz pianist and bandleader

Other visual arts
 Evan Lindquist (1936– ), artist, printmaker, and Artist Laureate of the State of Arkansas

Business
 Harry Lee, founder of the HD Lee Mercantile Company, inventor of Lee Jeans
 Matthew Rose (1959– ), railroad executive

Military
 Mary Ann Bickerdyke (1817–1901), American Civil War nurse

Politics

National
 Joseph L. Bristow (1861–1944), U.S. Senator from Kansas
 Marlin Fitzwater (1942– ), White House Press Secretary
 Dean M. Gillespie (1884–1949), U.S. Representative from Colorado
 Guy T. Helvering (1878–1946), U.S. Representative from Kansas
 Robert Hugh McWilliams, Jr. (1916–2013), United States federal judge
 William A. Phillips (1824–1893), city founder, U.S. Representative from Kansas
 Joseph Taggart (1867–1938), U.S. Representative from Kansas

State
 John W. Carlin (1940– ), 40th Governor of Kansas
 Bill Graves (1953– ), 43rd Governor of Kansas
 John F. Hayes (1919–2010), Kansas state legislator
 Dan G. Johnson, Idaho state legislator
 Lawton Nuss (1952– ), Kansas Supreme Court Chief Justice
 Shane Schoeller (1971– ), Missouri state legislator
 John Simpson (born 1934), Kansas State Senator and candidate for U.S. Senate
 Ernest Strahan (1901-1971), Kansas State Senator

Local
 Alan Jilka (1962– ), Salina politician

Religion
 John Balthasar Brungardt (1958– ), Bishop in the Catholic Church
 Frederick William Freking (1913–1998), Bishop in the Catholic Church

Sports

American football

 Terence Newman (1978– ), NFL cornerback
 Brent Venables (1970– ), University of Oklahoma Head Coach
 Sheahon Zenger (1966– ), assistant coach, university sports administrator

Baseball
 Bob Cain (1924–1997), pitcher
 Luke French (1985– ), pitcher
 Ryan Kohlmeier (1977– ), pitcher
 Gene Mauch (1925–2005), infielder, manager
 Pat Meares (1968– ), shortstop
 Ernest C. Quigley (1880–1960), umpire
 Bob Swift (1915–1966), manager

Basketball
 Kurt Budke (1961–2011), women's college basketball coach
 Howard Engleman (1919–2011), college basketball standout
 Todd Jadlow, basketball player
 Gene Johnson (1902–1989), assistant coach, 1932 USA Olympic basketball gold medal team

Other sports
 Adrianna Franch (1990– ), soccer goalkeeper
 Steve Fritz (1967– ), decathlete
 Jeremy Petty (1982– ), auto racer

See also

 Lists of people from Kansas

References

Salina, Kansas
Salina